Midnight Express may refer to:

 Midnight Express (book), a 1977 book by Billy Hayes and William Hoffer 
 Midnight Express (film), a 1978 film dramatization of the book

Film and television
 The Midnight Express (film), a 1924 romantic film

Music

Albums
 Midnight Express, alternate title of the album Oh, Boy! by Brotherhood of Man
 Midnight Express (EP), an extended play album by the band Gyroscope

Songs
 "Midnight Express",  by Brotherhood of Man from the album Oh, Boy! 
 "Midnight Express", an instrumental by rock band Extreme from Waiting for the Punchline

Other uses
 The Midnight Express (professional wrestling), a professional wrestling tag team in the 1980s
 Midnight Express, a 1993 military rescue operation conducted by the Sri Lankan Army, led by Sarath Fonseka